Chryseobacterium arachidiradicis  is a Gram-negative and rod-shaped bacteria from the genus of Chryseobacterium which has been isolated from soil around a peanut (Arachis hypogaea) in Alabama in the United States.

References

Further reading

External links
Type strain of Chryseobacterium arachidiradicis at BacDive -  the Bacterial Diversity Metadatabase

arachidiradicis
Bacteria described in 2015